There are a number of peaks named Mount Washington:

United States

Canada
 Mount Washington (British Columbia), on Vancouver Island

Washington